Alberto Martín Aguilar Suárez (born 9 March 1985) is a Venezuelan sprinter. He competed in the 4 × 400 m relay event at the 2012 Summer Olympics.

Personal bests
100 m: 10.55 s (wind: +0.7 m/s) –  Barquisimeto, 15 May 2014
200 m: 21.19 s (wind: +0.4 m/s) –  San Felipe, 9 May 2014
400 m: 45.71 s –  Barquisimeto, 15 May 2014

International competitions

References

External links
 
 
 Tilastopaja biography
 Alberto Martín Aguilar Suárez at the 2019 Pan American Games

1985 births
Living people
Venezuelan male sprinters
Olympic athletes of Venezuela
Athletes (track and field) at the 2012 Summer Olympics
Athletes (track and field) at the 2015 Pan American Games
Athletes (track and field) at the 2019 Pan American Games
Pan American Games medalists in athletics (track and field)
Pan American Games bronze medalists for Venezuela
Athletes (track and field) at the 2018 South American Games
South American Games silver medalists for Venezuela
South American Games medalists in athletics
Central American and Caribbean Games silver medalists for Venezuela
Central American and Caribbean Games bronze medalists for Venezuela
Competitors at the 2010 Central American and Caribbean Games
Competitors at the 2014 Central American and Caribbean Games
Competitors at the 2018 Central American and Caribbean Games
Central American and Caribbean Games medalists in athletics
Medalists at the 2011 Pan American Games
People from Apure
20th-century Venezuelan people
21st-century Venezuelan people